John Tabaiwalu Fakavale Matson (born 14 May 1973) is a New Zealand rugby union coach and a former New Zealand and Fiji rugby union representative. He is currently head coach of Premiership Rugby club Harlequins.

Education
Matson attended Nelson College from 1985 to 1986, before completing his secondary education at Christ's College in Christchurch.

Playing career
He was a member of the New Zealand national side, the All Blacks, in 1995 and 1996, playing 10 matches but no internationals. He played two matches for Fiji at the 1999 Rugby World Cup.

Coaching career
Matson formally played and coached Yamaha Júbilo in his final 3 seasons for the club. He went on to become assistant coach and player at the University of Queensland before becoming head coach of the Gold Coast Breakers in 2007.

In 2009 he help to reinvigorate the oldest Senior club on the gold coast as the Director of Rugby and Head coach of the 1st Grade Team they went on to win the Club Championships (in his absence as he joined Canterbury as an assistant near the end of the season).

He returned to New Zealand in 2009 acting as Canterbury assistant coach, before promoting up to head coach in 2012. He led Canterbury to their fifth consecutive ITM Cup title by winning the 2012 ITM Cup which set potentially an unbeaten run of victories in arguably the toughest Provincial Rugby Competition in the world.

In 2012 he was hired by the Brazil Rugby Federation as a consultant as they began their journey towards the Rio Olympics. He was focused on staging a training camp for the National Men's 15-a-side team and the Women's 7's team.

Matson is also the first non-Māori to coach the Māori All Blacks, assisting Head Coach Colin Cooper since 2013.

After Coaching the Māori All Blacks in their test victory against the Flying Fijians in June 2015, he joined Fiji where they went on to win the Pacific Nations Cup in Vancouver, Canada and then onto the 2015 Rugby World Cup.

Matson was an assistant coach for the 3 years for the Crusaders in the Super Rugby competition. He has held both Attack and Defence roles for them during his time and is a specialist backs coach. His departure was announced in September 2020.

He joined Premiership Rugby side Harlequins as a senior coach ahead of the 2021–22 season.

References

1973 births
Living people
People educated at Nelson College
People educated at Christ's College, Christchurch
New Zealand rugby union coaches
New Zealand rugby union players
New Zealand international rugby union players
Fiji international rugby union players
New Zealand expatriate sportspeople in England